Alfredo Vallebona (9 February 1926 – 1965) was an Argentine sailor. He competed in the Star event at the 1952 Summer Olympics.

References

External links
 

1926 births
1965 deaths
Argentine male sailors (sport)
Olympic sailors of Argentina
Sailors at the 1952 Summer Olympics – Star
Sportspeople from Buenos Aires